Grace Road Barracks was a TAVR Centre formerly based in Grace Road in Walton, Liverpool. The barracks were used by the Royal Signals and Parachute Regiment after WW2. Those serving after this time were defending the United Kingdom during the 'Cold War'.

References

 Image
 Grace Road Barracks

Military history of Liverpool